Johann Centurius Hoffmann Graf von Hoffmannsegg (23 August 1766 – 13 December 1849)  was a German botanist, entomologist and ornithologist. 

Hoffmannsegg was born at Rammenau and studied at Leipzig and Göttingen. He travelled through Europe acquiring vast collections of plants and animals.  He visited Hungary, Austria and Italy in 1795–1796 and Portugal from 1797 to 1801.  He sent his collections to Johann Karl Wilhelm Illiger, then in Brunswick, so that he could study them.

Hoffmannsegg worked in Berlin from 1804 to 1816, and was elected a member of the Academy of Science of the city in 1815.  He was the founder of the zoological museum of Berlin in 1809.  Hoffmannsegg proposed Illiger for the position of curator, and all the Hoffmannsegg's collections were then transferred to Berlin.

The legume genus Hoffmannseggia is named for him.

Notes

References

1766 births
1849 deaths
People from Bautzen (district)
People from the Electorate of Saxony
German entomologists
18th-century German botanists
German ornithologists
Pteridologists
Botanists with author abbreviations
Botanical illustrators
19th-century German botanists